Chemical Society Reviews is a biweekly peer-reviewed scientific journal published by the Royal Society of Chemistry, for review articles on topics of current interest in chemistry. Its predecessors were Quarterly Reviews, Chemical Society (1947–1971) and Royal Institute of Chemistry, Reviews (1968–1971); it maintained its current title since 1971. According to the Journal Citation Reports, the journal has a 2020 impact factor of 54.564. The current editor-in-chief (Chair of Editorial Board) is Douglas Stephan.

Chemical Society Reviews publishes occasional themed issues on new and emerging areas of research in the chemical sciences. These issues are edited by a guest editor who is a specialist in their field. Since 2005, Chemical Society Reviews has published reviews on topics of broad appeal, termed "social interest" reviews, such as articles on art conservation, forensics, and automotive fuels.

The journal is abstracted and indexed in PubMed/MEDLINE.

Article types 
Chemical Society Reviews publishes "Tutorial reviews" and "Critical reviews". The former are written to be of relevance both to the general research chemist who is new to the field, as well as the expert, whereas the latter aim to provide a deeper understanding of the topic in hand, but retain their accessibility through an introduction written for the general reader.

References

External links 
 

Chemistry journals
Royal Society of Chemistry academic journals
Bimonthly journals
Publications established in 1971
English-language journals
Review journals
1971 establishments in the United Kingdom